is an Italian herbal liqueur that is commonly consumed as an after-dinner digestif.  It usually has a bitter-sweet flavour, sometimes syrupy, and has an alcohol content between 16% and 40%.

Similar liqueurs have traditionally been produced throughout Europe. There are local varieties in Germany (where they are called Kräuterlikör), in Hungary, the Netherlands, and France. But the term amaro is applied only to Italian products of this kind.

Amaro is typically produced by macerating herbs, roots, flowers, bark, and/or citrus peels in alcohol, either neutral spirits or wine, mixing the filtrate with sugar syrup, and allowing the mixture to age in casks or bottles.

Dozens of varieties are commercially produced, the most commonly available of which are Averna, Ramazzotti, Lucano, and Montenegro.

Many commercial bottlers trace their recipe or production to the 19th century.  Recipes often originated in monasteries or pharmacies.

Amaro is typically drunk neat, sometimes with a citrus wedge. It may also be drunk on ice or with tonic water.

Flavorings
Amaro is flavored with several (sometimes several dozen) herbs and roots. Some producers list their ingredients in detail on the bottle label. Herbs used for flavoring may include any of the following: gentian, angelica, cardoon, cinchona (china), lemon balm (melissa), lemon verbena (cedrina), juniper, anise, fennel, zedoary, ginger, mint, thyme, sage, bay laurel, citrus peels, licorice, cinnamon, menthol, cardamom, saffron, rue (ruta), wormwood (assenzio), and elderflowers (sambuco).

Medium — typically 32% alcohol by volume, with an even balance between bitter, sweet, and citrus tastes. Examples of this type are Montenegro, Ramazzotti, Averna, Lucano, Luxardo Amaro Abano, Amaro Bio, Amaricano.
Fernet — more sharply bitter than other amari. Examples include Fernet-Branca, Luxardo Fernet, Amaro Santa Maria Al Monte.
Light — Lighter in colour than others, usually with more citrus notes.  Examples include Amaro Nonino, Amaro Florio, Amaro del Capo, Amaricano Bianca.
Alpine — flavoured with 'alpine' herbs, sometimes with a smokey taste, typically around 17% alcohol content. Examples include Amaro Alpino, Amaro Zara, Amaro Braulio.
Vermouth — Unlike other amaros, which are typically made from grain-based alcohol, vermouth amaro is wine-based. It is sweeter with more citrus, and very closely resembles the aperitif vermouth.  Examples are Amero, Amaro Don Bairo, Amaro Diesus del Frate.
Carciofo — made with artichoke, usually around 17% alcohol content.  These amari are usually taken as an aperitif, rather than a digestif.  Examples include Cynar and Carciofo (multiple producers).
Tartufo — made with black truffles, bottled at 30% alcohol.  Amari of this type are produced in the central Italian region of Umbria, which is known for its truffles, as well as in San Marino.
China — made with bark of Cinchona calisaya. The oldest and most popular brand is China Martini, based in Turin.
Rabarbaro — made with Chinese rhubarb. The oldest and most popular brand is Zucca, based in Milan.
Miscellaneous — made with honey, fennel, or unripe green walnuts (nocino).

Brands

The following is a list of some of the notable commercial brands:

Italy

Elsewhere

Sources

http://www.glasistre.hr/vijesti/pula_istra/amaru-zlatna-medalja-u-konkurenciji-2-100-pica-448998 (in Croatian)

http://www.glasistre.hr/vijesti/mozaik/dva-srebrna-odlicja-rovinjskim-likerima-507251 (in Croatian)

Italian liqueurs
Herbal liqueurs
Bitters
Italian alcoholic drinks